Quercus macranthera, commonly called the Caucasian oak, or the Persian oak, is a species of deciduous tree native to Western Asia (northern Iran, Turkey;
It is placed in section Quercus.

Subspecies
It has two subspecies. One subspecies (Quercus macranthera subsp. syspirensis) is found in the thermophilic lower- and mid-montane shrub communities of Turkey, and the other subspecies (Quercus macranthera subsp. macranthera) is found in Georgia, Armenia, Azerbaijan and northern Iran, along the Caspian Sea.

References

macranthera
Plants described in 1838
Flora of Armenia
Flora of Azerbaijan
Trees of Western Asia
Flora of Turkey
Ornamental trees
Garden plants of Asia